Iva Hercíková (2 November 1935 in Pardubice, Czechoslovakia – 27 January 2007 in Czech Republic) was a Czech writer and author of novels and movie scripts.

Career
Iva Hercíková, née Vodňanská, graduated from grammar school in Liberec in 1954. She studied dramaturgy and theatre sciences at DAMU, the Academy of Performing Arts in Prague, graduating in 1958. She married her second husband, Jiří Robert Pick, in 1961.

Emigration
In 1986, Hercíková emigrated with her third husband to Germany and in 1987 to the United States. They settled in Florida and then in Manhattan, New York. She retained her Czech citizenship.

Velvet revolution
After the Velvet revolution Hercíková spent several months in Prague. She moved back to the Czech Republic in 2000, where she lived until her suicide at the age of 71.

External links
  Short Biography
  CFN Entry

1935 births
2007 suicides
Czech women writers
Writers from Pardubice
Suicides in the Czech Republic